Hajjateh (also Romanized as Ḩājjateh; also known as Ḩājjatī Bālāband) is a village in Goli Jan Rural District, in the Central District of Tonekabon County, Mazandaran Province, Iran. At the 2006 census, its population was 27, in 8 families.

References 

Populated places in Tonekabon County